Heteroderces is a genus of moths in the family Lecithoceridae.

Species
 Heteroderces oxylitha Meyrick, 1929
 Heteroderces paeta Meyrick, 1929

References

Natural History Museum Lepidoptera genus database

Lecithoceridae
Moths of Asia
Moth genera